Graciela Flores "Grace" Napolitano (born December 4, 1936) is an American Democratic Party politician who has represented California's San Gabriel Valley and other parts of Los Angeles County in the United States House of Representatives since 1999. Her district is currently numbered . She previously served in the California State Assembly and the Norwalk City Council.

Napolitano represented the 34th district from 1999 to 2003, the 38th district from 2003 to 2013, and the 32nd district from 2013 to 2023. Due to redistricting, Napolitano ran for and won reelection in the 2012 United States elections in  against Republican nominee David Miller. In the 2014 midterm elections, Napolitano was reelected, defeating Republican nominee Arturo Alas.

Early life, education and career
Napolitano was born and raised in Brownsville, Texas. After high school, she married and moved with her husband to California, where they raised five children.

Napolitano began her political career as a member of the Norwalk City Council, winning her first election in 1986 by 28 votes. Four years later, she was reelected by the largest margin recorded in city history. In 1989, Napolitano's council colleagues elevated her to serve as mayor. During her council tenure, she focused much of her attention on providing access to constituents and on redevelopment and transportation issues to address the city's need for jobs and a more diversified economic base.

Napolitano made her way up through the ranks of Ford Motor Company for 21 years. After her retirement in 1992, she was elected to the California Assembly and became a leader in international trade, environmental protection, transportation and immigration. In 1996 she requested and received the creation of the first new California State Assembly Standing Committee in nine years, the Committee on International Trade, which she chaired until being termed out in 1998. In her six years in the Assembly, she also served as chair of the Women's Caucus and vice chair of the Latino caucus.

Napolitano is a member of the Congressional Progressive Caucus.

U.S. House of Representatives

Elections

1998 
In 1998, Napolitano was termed out of the State Assembly and decided to run for a State Senate seat being vacated by Charles Calderon. She would be facing a difficult race against fellow termed-out Assemblywoman Martha Escutia. Three days before the candidate filing deadline, U.S. Representative Esteban Torres announced his retirement, hoping the late timing of his decision would help his son-in-law, James "Jamie" Casso, win the seat. Napolitano switched races at the last moment and narrowly defeated Casso in the Democratic primary, 51% to 49%.
A 2009 story first reported by Bloomberg News and further detailed by the Los Angeles Times questioned the personal loan interest rate that the Federal Election Commission authorized Napolitano to use during her 1998 campaign for Congress. Both Bloomberg and the Times noted that the FEC had accepted the argument that the 18% rate was equivalent to the early withdrawal penalty that Napolitano was subject to by withdrawing $150,000 from her employee retirement fund and then lending that money to her campaign. Both sources also reported the rate dropping to 10% in 2006, and cited FEC filings as of December 31, 2009, indicating that $221,780 in interest had been paid. The Hill reported that FEC filings for the campaign reporting period ending September 30, 2010, indicated that the debt had been completely retired.

Tenure 
In 2011, Napolitano voted against the National Defense Authorization Act for Fiscal Year 2012 as part of a controversial provision that allows the government and the military to indefinitely detain American citizens and others without trial.

Natural Resources Committee
Napolitano has been a member of the House Committee on Natural Resources since the 106th Congress and was selected as chair of the Water and Power Subcommittee for the 110th Congress. She has promoted conservation, water recycling, desalination, and sound groundwater management and storage to address Southern California's need for adequate water quality and supply. She is proud of her legislative efforts on a number of fronts—assisting in the implementation of the CALFED Bay-Delta Program, a water management plan for the State of California, protection of the ecosystem in the Bay-Delta and promotion of the use of advanced technologies. She is also a member of the Congressional Wildlife Refuge Caucus.

Transportation and Infrastructure Committee
At the start of the 110th Congress, Napolitano became the most senior new member of the House Committee on Transportation and Infrastructure, with jurisdiction over America's aviation system, surface transportation, freight and passenger rail, the inland waterway system, international maritime commerce, the Economic Development Administration, the U.S. Army Corps of Engineers' support of the nation's water resources, and the federal clean water program. Napolitano's experience includes six years on the California State Assembly Transportation Committee, and current work on rail safety and congestion relief in the San Gabriel Valley.

Hearings:
Oversight of U.S. Airline Customer Service: May 2, 2017.  Napolitano posed questions to the witnesses, including Oscar Munoz, after committee chair Bill Shuster left his chair. Her questions were critical of the airlines' plans to impose self-regulation in response to recent customer service controversies. As the founder and chair of the Congressional Mental Health Caucus, Napolitano further asked whether the airlines provide mental health services to their employees because of the stressful nature of flight attendant jobs and increasing demands that airlines make of flight attendants. William J. McGee, the country's foremost expert and advocate on consumer rights as the Aviation Consultant for Consumers Union responded that this was "an excellent question because… right now we have a situation where employees are under tremendous strain because of the executive decisions that are putting flight attendants in the front lines of many of these situations. Flight attendants have a primary responsibility to ensure safety, evacuation, and of course customer service, but we have asked them to be bouncers, and police officers, and all kinds of other things, so there is no question that there is an issue of training as well."

Congressional Mental Health Caucus
Statistics showing one in three Latina adolescents contemplated suicide prompted Napolitano to spearhead a school-based Latina adolescent mental health program in three local middle schools and one high school. She and Tim Murphy co-chair the Congressional Mental Health Caucus. The bipartisan caucus included more than 70 members during the 108th Congress and over 90 members during the 109th Congress. As co-chair, Napolitano has hosted congressional briefings on children's and veteran's mental health needs, working on proposals to improve VA mental health services. A key priority is legislation to provide mental health parity in health insurance.

Congressional Hispanic Caucus
During the 109th Congress, Napolitano chaired the Congressional Hispanic Caucus, which continues to address national education, immigration, health, and civil rights issues, and the impact these policies have on the Hispanic community.

Committee assignments
Committee on Natural Resources
Subcommittee on Water, Oceans, and Wildlife
Committee on Transportation and Infrastructure
 Subcommittee on Economic Development, Public Buildings, and Emergency Management
Subcommittee on Highways and Transit
Subcommittee on Railroads, Pipelines, and Hazardous Materials
Subcommittee on Water Resources and Environment

Caucus memberships
Medicare for All Caucus
Congressional Hispanic Caucus 
Congressional Mental Health Caucus (Co-Chair)
Congressional Wildlife Refuge Caucus
United States Congressional International Conservation Caucus
House Baltic Caucus
Congressional Arts Caucus
Congressional Asian Pacific American Caucus
Congressional Progressive Caucus

Political positions

Abortion
Napolitano opposed the overturning of Roe v. Wade, calling it "abhorrent" and a "dreadfully sad and dark day when you wake up with fewer and diminished rights in the United States of America."

Personal life
Napolitano was married to Frank Napolitano, a restaurateur and community activist, from the early 1980s until his death from cancer on December 15, 2017, aged 90. Grace Napolitano had five children from a previous marriage, which ended with her husband's death. In 2013, their daughter Yolanda Maria Louwers died of cancer. Louwers was regularly on the campaign trail with Napolitano throughout her political career.

On February 13, 2016, Napolitano had a minor hemorragic stroke during a campaign event. She returned to work by mid-April.

See also
 List of Hispanic and Latino Americans in the United States Congress
 Women in the United States House of Representatives

References

External links

 Congresswoman Grace Napolitano official U.S. House website
 Grace Napolitano for Congress campaign website 
 
 

|-

|-

|-

|-

|-

|-

1936 births
20th-century American politicians
20th-century American women politicians
21st-century American politicians
American politicians of Mexican descent
Female members of the United States House of Representatives
Hispanic and Latino American mayors in California
Hispanic and Latino American members of the United States Congress
Hispanic and Latino American state legislators in California
Hispanic and Latino American women in politics
Living people
Mayors of places in California
Democratic Party members of the California State Assembly
Democratic Party members of the United States House of Representatives from California
People from Brownsville, Texas
People from Norwalk, California
Women mayors of places in California
Women state legislators in California
21st-century American women politicians